La Fierté des nôtres is the third album by French rapper Rohff, released in 2004 by the EMI label.

To date, it has sold 225,000 copies in France alone.

Track listing

Disc one
"La Fierté Des Nôtres (Intro)" (Produced by JR Rotem)
"Nouveau Rap"
"Le Milieu"
"La Vie Continue"
"Ca Fait Plaisir" (Produced by JR Rotem)
Featuring Intouchable
"Dur D'Être Peace" (Produced by DJ Khalil)
Featuring Janice
"Pleure Pas"
"Pétrole" (Produced by JR Rotem)
Featuring Kayna Samet
"Trop D'Energie"
Featuring Mohamed Lamine
"Message A La Racaille"
"Le Cœur D'Un Homme"
"Souvenir"
"Charisme" (Produced by JR Rotem)
Featuring Wallen
"Le Son Qui Tue" (Produced by Don Silver)
Featuring Nathy
"Le Son De La Hagra"
Featuring Expression Direkt
"Mal Aimé"
Featuring Kery James

Disc two
"Fils A Pap"
"T'Es Pas Comme Moi" (Produced by Don Silver)
"Bling Bling" (Produced by JR Rotem)
Featuring Admiral T
"Apparences Trompeuses" (Produced by JR Rotem)
"Sincère" (Produced by Don Silver)
"Toujours Ton Enfant"
"Fiston"
Featuring J Mi Sissoko
"Pervertie"
"Bollywood Style" (Produced by Don Silver)
"Zone Internationale"
Featuring Roldán (Orishas)
"94" (Produced by Mr. Porter)
"Le Mot D'Ordre"
"Code 187" (Produced by Don Silver)
Featuring Kamelancien, Alibi Montana & Sefyu
"J'Rappe Mieux Que Toi (Outro)"

Video clips 
"Le Son Qui Tue" 
Featuring Nathy
"Zone Internationale"
Featuring Roldan G. Rivero (Orishas)
"94"

2004 albums
EMI Records albums
Rohff albums